Michael Maynard (born 23 February 1937) is a British sailor. He competed in the Finn event at the 1968 Summer Olympics.

References

External links
 

1937 births
Living people
British male sailors (sport)
Olympic sailors of Great Britain
Sailors at the 1968 Summer Olympics – Finn
People from Saltash